Steven James Harper (born 3 February 1969) is an English former footballer who scored 54 goals in 504 league games in a 15-year career in the Football League. He was a speedy winger, adept at dribbling the ball.

He began his professional career at Port Vale in June 1987, before he was sold to Preston North End for £35,000 in March 1989. He joined Burnley on a free transfer in July 1991, and helped the "Clarets" to win the Fourth Division title in 1991–92. He moved on to Doncaster Rovers in August 1993, before he was sold on to Mansfield Town for a £20,000 fee in September 1995. He took a free transfer to Hull City in July 1999, before joining Darlington in February 2001. He left the Football League in 2002, and moved into non-league football with Kidsgrove Athletic. He later became a coach.

Playing career
Harper graduated through Port Vale juniors to sign professional forms under manager John Rudge in June 1987. He played regular football for the start of the 1987–88 season, and scored his first goal on 5 September, in a 2–1 victory over York City at Vale Park. However he lost his first team place in January, and finished the campaign with two goals in 25 games. He made eight appearances for the "Valiants" in the 1988–89 season, but fell out of favour and was sold to Third Division rivals Preston North End for £35,000 and 50% of any future transfer deal in March 1989. Preston were managed by former Port Vale boss John McGrath. Ironically the "Lambs" lost to Vale in the play-offs at the end of the 1988–89 campaign. They then dropped to 19th in 1989–90 and 17th in 1990–91 under Les Chapman's stewardship.

Harper left Deepdale to join Fourth Division club Burnley on a free transfer in July 1991. He scored six goals in 48 games in 1991–92, as Frank Casper and Jimmy Mullen led the "Clarets" to promotion as champions. Harper scored five goals in 42 appearances in 1992–93, but departed Turf Moor after he was replaced by David Eyres and was given a free transfer to Doncaster Rovers in August 1993. Ian Atkins took "Donny" to 15th in the Third Division (previously called the Fourth Division) in 1993–94. He was then joined at Belle Vue by his former Burnley partner Ian Measham. Sammy Chung then led Rovers to ninth place in 1994–95.

Harper was sold to Andy King's Mansfield Town for a £20,000 fee in September 1995. The "Stags" finished in the lower half of the Third Division table in 1995–96. Steve Parkin then replaced King in the hot-seat at Field Mill, and instigated a minor revival. Harper scored two goals in 38 appearances in 1996–97, as Mansfield finished five points behind Cardiff City, who occupied the final play-off position. He scored five goals in 52 games in 1997–98, as the club again finished five points short of the play-off places. His goal tally included a 17-minute hat-trick on 21 February, in a 4–0 home win over Darlington. He then claimed six goals in 51 appearances in the 1998–99 campaign, as Mansfield came to within one place and four points of a play-off place.

He took a free transfer to Hull City in July 1999, and scored four goals in 38 games in the 1999–2000 campaign, as Warren Joyce's "Tigers" posted a 14th-place finish. New manager Brian Little allowed Harper to leave Boothferry Park on a free transfer to league rivals Darlington in February 2001. The "Quakers" finished four points above the bottom of the Football League in 2000–01 under the stewardship of Gary Bennett. Harper played 25 games in the 2001–02 campaign, scoring once against Leyton Orient, before he was allowed to leave Feethams by new manager Tommy Taylor. He then ended his career after a short spell with Northern Premier League side Kidsgrove Athletic.

Coaching career
Harper spent six years as a coach at the academy at Stoke City, before he was appointed as a first team coach at Chasetown in May 2017.

Career statistics
Source:

Honours
Burnley
Football League Fourth Division: 1991–92

References

1969 births
Living people
Sportspeople from Newcastle-under-Lyme
English footballers
Association football midfielders
Port Vale F.C. players
Preston North End F.C. players
Burnley F.C. players
Doncaster Rovers F.C. players
Mansfield Town F.C. players
Hull City A.F.C. players
Darlington F.C. players
Kidsgrove Athletic F.C. players
English Football League players
Northern Premier League players
Association football coaches
Stoke City F.C. non-playing staff